The 1941 Colima earthquake occurred on April 15 at 19:09 UTC (13:09 local time). The epicenter was located in the State of Michoacán, Mexico.

The magnitude of this earthquake was put at Ms 7.7 or Mw 7.7. The intensities were [[Mercalli intensity scale|X (Extreme)]] in Colima, VIII (Severe) in Manzanillo, and V (Moderate'') in Mexico City. Ninety people were reported dead. The cathedral of Colima was destroyed. Many houses and public buildings in Colima, including the Federal Palace (Palacio federal) and the Hidalgo Theater (Teatro Hidalgo), were damaged. Of the 8,000 houses in the city of Colima, 900 or 2000 collapsed, according to different sources.

This earthquake was an interplate earthquake between the Cocos Plate and the North American Plate. It occurred in the Colima region of the Middle America Trench. This earthquake was very close to where the 1973 Colima earthquake occurred. From the locally recorded time intervals between the arrival of the S wave and the P wave (S−P times) and from the felt intensities, it is suggested that the rupture zone of this earthquake was larger than the 1973 earthquake and may have extended into the rupture zone of the 1985 Michoacán earthquake.

See also
 List of earthquakes in 1941
 List of earthquakes in Mexico

References

External links 
 

1941 earthquakes
Earthquakes in Mexico
1941 in Mexico
History of Colima
History of Michoacán
Natural history of Colima
Natural history of Michoacán
1941 disasters in Mexico